Denver Kickers are an American soccer club, founded in 1956. The club fields a number of teams at the adult and youth levels.  The Kickers premier team plays in the United States Adult Soccer Association sanctioned Colorado Adult Soccer Association, formerly the Colorado State Soccer Association. The club is a former member of the National Premier Soccer League (NPSL), the fourth tier of the American Soccer Pyramid, and played in the Southwest Conference.

They currently play their home games at the Denver Kickers Sport Complex in Golden, Colorado, 15 miles west of downtown Denver. The team's colors are red, white and blue. When the Kickers won the National Amateur Cup in 1977, 1978, and 1983, their colors were white jerseys, black shorts, and white stockings.  The Kickers repeated as National Amateur champions in 1994 and 1995.

The Kickers are part of a larger organization which celebrates the German heritage of the Denver area through sports – mainly soccer and dancing. In addition to the NPSL side, the Kickers organization has over 400 members and sponsors four Men's Adult Soccer teams, one Women's Adult Soccer team, Competitive Youth Soccer teams, and Recreation Youth Soccer teams, as well as Adult and Junior Schuhplattlers (Bavarian Dance Groups).  Current management of the Kickers says the club was founded in 1962 and today's team patches carry this date, but there are club banners and patches with the date 1956:  According to long-time member and former chairman John Ziel, the Denver Kickers as a soccer team began in 1956, and the Kickers organization was incorporated in 1962.

Year-by-year

External links
 Denver Kickers

National Premier Soccer League teams
K
Soccer clubs in Colorado
Golden, Colorado
1962 establishments in Colorado
Association football clubs established in 1956